Benji Kirkpatrick (born 1976) is an English folk singer and musician, who plays guitar, bouzouki, mandolin and tenor banjo. A son of folk musicians John Kirkpatrick and Sue Harris, he was brought up in Shropshire. Previously a member of Bellowhead and the Seth Lakeman band, he now performs as a solo artist and also as a member of both Faustus and Steeleye Span. He lives in Leamington Spa, Warwickshire.

Kirkpatrick's album of acoustic covers of Jimi Hendrix songs was released in 2015.

Discography

EPs
People, EDJ Records – EDJ014, 2007

Albums
 Dance in the Shadow, WildGoose Studios – WGS291CD, 1998
 Half a Fruit Pie, Fellside Recordings – FECD181, 2004
 Boomerang, Navigator Records – NAVIGATOR 2, 2007
 Hendrix Songs, EDJ Records – EDJ020, 2015
 Gold has Worn Away, Westpark, 2019

References

External links

1976 births
Living people
21st-century British guitarists
21st-century English singers
Bellowhead members
Bouzouki players
British mandolinists
English banjoists
English folk musicians
English folk singers
Faustus (band) members
Music in Warwickshire
Musicians from Shropshire
Steeleye Span members